Daniela Kuleska (born 13 April 1981) is a Macedonian middle-distance runner. She competed in the women's 1500 metres at the 2000 Summer Olympics.

References

1981 births
Living people
Athletes (track and field) at the 2000 Summer Olympics
Macedonian female middle-distance runners
Olympic athletes of North Macedonia
Place of birth missing (living people)